This is a list of national parks in Ecuador.

National parks
There are 11 national parks:

National Reserves

Ecological reserves
There are 9 national ecological reserves:

 Arenillas Ecological Reserve
 Manglares Churute Ecological Reserve
 Antisana Ecological Reserve
 Cotacachi Cayapas Ecological Reserve
 El Angel Ecological Reserve
 Illinizas Ecological Reserve
 Manglares Cayapas Mataje Ecological Reserve
 Cofán-Bemejo Ecological Reserve
 Mache-Chindul Ecological Reserve

Biological reserves
There are 4 National biological reserves:

 Cerro Plateado (Silver Hill) Biological Reserve
 El Quimi Biological Reserve
 El Cóndor Biological Reserve
 Limoncocha National Biological Reserve

Geobotanical reserve
There is one National geobotanical reserve:

 Pululahua Geobotanical Reserve

Wildlife refuges
There are 10 National wildlife refuges:

 Pasochoa Wildlife Refuges
 Isla Santa Clara Wildlife Refuges
 Isla Corazón y Fragata Wildlife Refuges
 La Chiquita Wildlife Refuges
 El Zarza Wildlife Refuges
 El Pambilar Wildlife Refuges
 Pacoche Wildlife Refuges
 El Morro Swamps Wildlife Refuges
 Rio Muisne Estuary Swampland Wildlife Refuges
 Rio Esmereldas Estuary Swampland Wildlife Refuges

Private Reserves
In addition to the many National reserves, refuges and parks in Ecuador there are some privately owned and operated reserves and refuges not listed on this page which is exclusively National Parks and other National Ecological Assets.

References

External links 
 Official Map of Ecuador's Protected Areas
 Unofficial Map of Ecuador's National Protected Areas

 
E
National parks
National parks